Kleijn is a Dutch surname meaning "small". The ij digraph is often replaced with a "y" (Kleyn). Among variant forms are De Kleijn, Kleijne, Klein, Kleine, and Klijn. Notable people with the surname include:

Antoinette Kleyn-Ockerse (1762–1828), Dutch poet, mother of Pieter Rudolph Kleijn
Arvid de Kleijn (born 1994), Dutch racing cyclist
Eelke Kleijn (born 1983), Dutch producer and DJ
Jan Kleyn (1925–2009), Dutch sprinter
Jean Kleyn (born 1993), South African rugby player
Matthijs Kleyn (born 1979), Dutch television presenter, novelist, and tabloid journalist
Pieter Rudolph Kleijn (1785–1816), Dutch landscape painter, son of Antoinette Kleijn-Ockerse

See also
 Leo Klejn (born 1927), Russian archaeologist, anthropologist and philologist
 Klajn

References

Dutch-language surnames